Hinata Dam  is a gravity dam located in Iwate Prefecture in Japan. The dam is used for flood control. The catchment area of the dam is 22 km2. The dam impounds about 29  ha of land when full and can store 5700 thousand cubic meters of water. The construction of the dam was started on 1981 and completed in 1997.

See also
List of dams in Japan

References

Dams in Iwate Prefecture